Hlín Eiríksdóttir (born 12 June 2000) is an Icelandic footballer who last played as a midfielder for Damallsvenskan club Piteå IF. She has been part of the Iceland women's national football team since 2018.

Career

Club
Hlín made her Úrvalsdeild debut with Valur in 2015. She played her first game on September 1, 2015, when she replaced Berglind Rós Ágústsdóttir in the 64th minute in a 0–4 defeat against Þór/KA. It would be her only appearance that summer. Hlín's first goal for her senior side came against Breiðablik on August 10, 2017 in a 2–0 win at home.

In December 2020, Hlín signed with Piteå IF of the Swedish top-tier Damallsvenskan. In November 2022, it was reported that she would not play for the team the following season.

International
Hlín debuted for Iceland U17 on April 23, 2015 at 14 years old in a match against Wales. She participated in all the six matches Iceland U17 played in the 2017 UEFA Women's Under-17 Championship qualification. On August 25, 2016, Hlín debuted for Iceland U19 in a match against Poland. On January 23, 2018 Hlín made her first appearance for Iceland Senior Team in a friendly match against Norway. Hlín scored her first international goal against Denmark in the 2018 Algarve Cup.

International goals
Scores and results list the Iceland's goal tally first.

Personal life
Eiríksdóttir's mother is former Iceland women's national football team player Guðrún Sæmundsdóttir.

References

External links
 
 
 

2000 births
Living people
Hlin Eiriksdottir
Hlin Eiriksdottir
Hlin Eiriksdottir
Women's association football midfielders